Anupa Barla (born 6 May 1994) is an Indian female field hockey player.

References

1994 births
Living people
People from Sundergarh district
Indian female field hockey players
Field hockey players from Odisha
Sportswomen from Odisha
Field hockey players at the 2014 Commonwealth Games
Commonwealth Games competitors for India
21st-century Indian women
21st-century Indian people